Bishop Venedykt (Aleksiychuk), bishop of Ukrainian Catholic Eparchy of Chicago (born January 16, 1968, in Borshchivka, Kostopil Raion, Rivne Oblast, Ukrainian SSR). Became auxiliary bishop of Lviv on September 5, 2010; became bishop of Ukrainian Catholic Eparchy of Chicago on June 29, 2017.

Life
 Was born on January 16, 1968, in Borshchivka village, Kostopil district, Rivne region.
 From 1975 till 1983 he studied at the Borshchivka grade school (eight-grade school). 
 In 1983 he began his studies at Rivne medical college, completing his degree in 1987 as a Physician's Assistant. After graduation, he worked as an Emergency Medical Technician at the Ambulance Station in Kostopil.
 From 1987 to 1989 he served in the military. Afterwards, from 1989 to 1990 he worked as a Physician's Assistant, initially at a city clinic, and later at the sanatorium “Karpaty” in the city of Truskavets. 
 From 1990 to 1993 he studied at the Drohobych Spiritual Seminary. On October 9, 1991, he was ordained a deacon by Bishop Phylymon (Kurchaba). On March 29, 1992, he received his priestly ordination from His Beatitude Myroslav-Ivan (Lyubachivskyi).
 In April 1992 he was appointed administrator at a parish in Bystrytsia village, Drohobych deanery. Simultaneously he served as Assistant Priest at Holy Trinity Church in Drohobych and was responsible children's ministry within the deanery. From 1992 to 1994 he also worked for the Patriarchal Catechetical Commission where he was responsible for the organization of mission work in Eastern Ukraine. 
 On May 13, 1993, he joined the Univ Holy Dormition Lavra of the Studite Order. He accepted Tonsure on October 13, 1993, and received the Little Schema on December 31, 1995. 
 Beginning in July 1994 he worked on the renewal of monastic life and the restoration of the Monastery of Borys and Hlib in Polotsk (Belarus), while simultaneously serving at the parishes in Polotsk, Vitebsk, Gomel, Mogilev, Brest (Belarus Greek Catholic Church). He was the spiritual father of Christian Youth Community in Minsk.
 In 1996 he completed a Masters of Theology Degree at Lublin Catholic University. The topic of his master's thesis was “Christian spirituality according to St. John of Kronstadt”. 
 On December 3, 1996, he was transferred to St. Catharines, Canada with the aim to found a monastery there. At the time, he also served at the parishes of Grimsby and Beamsville (Toronto Eparchy of the UGCC). He returned to Ukraine in April 1999, after being elected hegumen of the Holy Dormition Univ Lavra. In May 2000 he was re-elected hegumen and in May 2005 elected for a third term. 
 In October 2004 he continued his theological studies at Lublin Catholic University, completing his Licentiate Degree in 2006. At the same university, on April 18, 2008, he defended his PhD thesis on the topic “The Superior as a Spiritual Father. Investigation in the light of the works of Saint Theodore the Studite.”
 2004-’10 – Served as a member of the Patriarchal Commission  of Monasticism.
 2006 – Served as administrator of St. Nicholas parish in Peremyshlyany.
 2006-’08 – Served as the Head of the Secretariat of UGCC Council of Monasticism.
 2007-’09 – Headed the UGCC Liturgical Council on preparing texts of divine services. 
 2007-’10 – Served as the Head of the Council of Higher Superiors of Monasteries of the UGCC. 
 2009 – Appointed a member of the Secretariat of the Patriarchal Sobor, which was held in Brazil in 2011. 
 2008-’10 – He completed a course of Practical Psychology at the European School of Correspondential Education (Kharkiv).
 2009-’10 – Studied “Propaedeutics of mental disorders” at the Ukrainian Community of Psychiatrists. 
 2009-’12 – Studied pedagogy and psychology at the Ignatianum Academy in Krakow (Poland). 

On August 3, 2010, Lyubomyr Husar, Major Archbishop of Kyiv-Galicia, by general consent of the Synod of Bishops of the UGCC, appointed hieromonk Venedykt Aleksiychuk bishop-auxiliary of Lviv Archeparchy. 
His episcopal chirotonia (ordination) was held on September 5, 2010, at St. George's Cathedral in Lviv (the main consecrator – Archbishop Ihor Voznyak, Metropolitan of Lviv, co-consecrators: Bishop of Sambir-Drohobych Yulian Voronovskyi and Bishop of Stamford Pavlo Chomytskyi). 
 On September 8, 2010, he was appointed the Head of Staff of the Lviv Archeparchy Curia. 
 On September 26, 2011, he was appointed the Head of the Patriarchal Liturgical Commission of the UGCC. He also currently serves as the Chair of the Synodal Committee on Liturgical Issues.
 Since 2014 he has been a member of the charitable religious community “Saint Sophia” in Rome. 
 In 2014 to 2016 he studied in the Key Executive MBA Program at the Ukrainian Catholic University in Lviv and obtained a master's degree in Business Administration in June 2016.
 On July 13, 2015, His Beatitude Sviatoslav named him a Senator of the Ukrainian Catholic University. 
 On December 14, 2015, he was awarded with the Cross of Military Chaplain. 
 On April 20, 2017, Pope Francis appointed him Bishop of the Eparchy of Saint Nicholas of Chicago of the Ukrainians, United States of America.

Published books 
A Superior as A Spiritual Father - 2009

Spiritual Instructions - 2010

Be Saints - 2011

Borshchivka – A Pearl of Polesia - 2013

Reflections on The Liturgical Reading of Gospel - 2015

Reflections on The Liturgical Reading of the Apostles – 2015

See also
 

 Catholic Church hierarchy
 Catholic Church in the United States
 Historical list of the Catholic bishops of the United States
 List of Catholic bishops of the United States
 Lists of patriarchs, archbishops, and bishops

References

External links

 Ukrainian Catholic Eparchy of Chicago Official Site

Episcopal succession

1968 births
Living people
Eastern Catholic bishops in the United States
People from Rivne Oblast
John Paul II Catholic University of Lublin alumni
Ukrainian Eastern Catholics
Studite Brethren
Bishops of the Ukrainian Greek Catholic Church